Pioneer Field is a 3,500-seat college football stadium located in Tusculum, Tennessee. The stadium is the home of the Pioneers football team of Tusculum College. The Pioneers compete in the National Collegiate Athletic Association (NCAA) Division II South Atlantic Conference (SAC).

References

External links
Tusculum Pioneers - Football website

College football venues
Tusculum Pioneers football
Buildings and structures in Greene County, Tennessee
American football venues in Tennessee
Tusculum, Tennessee